Heinätorinpuisto Park is a public park in the Hollihaka district of Oulu, Finland.

Parks in Oulu
Hollihaka